Jimmy Spencer may refer to:

 Jimmy Spencer (American football) (born 1969), American NFL cornerback
 Jimmy Spencer (game design) (born 1990), American game designer 
 Jimmy Spencer (footballer) (born 1991), English football player
 Jimmy Spencer (racing driver) (born 1957), American racing driver

See also
James Spencer (disambiguation)